The 2022 CECAFA U-20 Championship was the 14th edition and was hosted in Sudan. It was scheduled to be played from 28 October to 11 November 2022.

Uganda won previous edition title in 2020 and successfully defended their title.

This competition served as the CECAFA qualifiers for the 2023 Africa U-20 Cup of Nations.

Venues
Al Hilal Stadium in Omdurman

Teams

 (Hosts)

Did not enter

Officials

Group stage
The draw for the fixtures was held on 11 October 2022.

All times are local, CAT (UTC+2).

The seven teams were drawn into two groups of three and four teams. The winners and the runners-up of each group advanced to the semi-finals.

Group A

Group B

Knockout stage

Semi-finals
Winners qualified for 2023 Africa U-20 Cup of Nations.

Third place

Final

Qualification for CAF U20 Cup of Nations
The two finalists of the tournament qualified for the 2023 Africa U-20 Cup of Nations. 

Qualified nations:

Goalscorers

References

CECAFA competitions
Association football governing bodies in Africa